Stadion u Lugu is a football stadium in Kolašin, Montenegro. Situated on the Tara riverbank, it is used for football matches. It is the home ground of FK Gorštak.

History
The stadium was built during the sixties,. In 2016, FK Gorštak presented stadium renovation project, with a planned capacity of 1,968 seats.

Pitch and conditions
The pitch measures 105 x 65 meters. The stadium didn't met UEFA criteria for European competitions.
There are two additional fields near the main ground. During the nineties, stadium of 'Bianca' Hotel is built, with two stands and capacity of 1,000 seats. In 2013, Football Association of Montenegro built an additional field with articificial turf, so there are three grounds on Kolašin football complex today.
Except FK Gorštak games, during the summer months, because of good climate and accommodation, the stadium is used for exhibition matches, tournaments, trainings and preparations of many football teams from the region (Montenegro, Serbia and Albania).

See also
FK Gorštak
Kolašin

External links
 Stadium information
 Stadium 'Bianca' information

References 

Football venues in Montenegro
Kolašin